811 Main (formerly BG Group Place and MainPlace) is a 630 ft (192 m) tall skyscraper in Downtown Houston, Texas. It was completed in February 2011 and has 46 floors. It is LEED Platinum Certified. When it was completed, BG Group Place became the 15th tallest building in Houston and features a skygarden on the 39th floor. It is the tallest building built in Houston in 23 years, after the Heritage Plaza was completed in 1987.
The naming was done when BG Group Plc became an anchor tenant and leased 164,000sq ft of space.
The primary monument & all core signage for the facility was built by Ad Display Sign Systems.
Current major tenants include:
Crestwood Midstream Partners
KPMG
Baker Hostetler 
Latham & Watkins
Quorum
Citi
Kayne Anderson
Reed Smith

Environmental features
Features included in the building is a 39th-floor skygarden and a fully gardened top floor of the parking garage, that soaks up rainwater. Water that condenses in the building's air-conditioning system is used to irrigate the plants.

Glass fins that act as sunshades reduce the building's need for air-conditioning. The 10-foot ceilings (a foot higher than the modern standard) allow in more sunlight, cutting the need for electric lights.

Layout
Each floor is on average  and can hold up to 8 full corner offices.
Basement Floor 2: Parking
Basement Floor 1: Parking, access to Downtown Houston tunnel system, and a small area for retail space. 
1st Floor: Lobby, 1 large and 1 small retail space area, as well as reserved and unreserved parking. Access to the Downtown Houston tunnel system will also be available via an escalator to Basement Floor 1.
Floors 2-10: Parking
Floor 11: Garage rooftop garden and premium office space
Floors 12-20: Low rise office space
Floor 21: Low to mid transfer
Floors 22-33: Mid rise office space
Floor 34: Mid to high transfer
Floors 35 and 36: High rise office space
Floors 37 and 38: Premium loft office space
Floors 39-43: Sky Garden and premium office space (not open to the public)
Floors 44-46: High rise office space
Floor 47: Mechanical Area

See also

List of tallest buildings in Houston

Notes

References
MainPlace
Skyscraperpage
Hines

External links 

Skyscraper office buildings in Houston
Office buildings completed in 2010
Leadership in Energy and Environmental Design platinum certified buildings